The  is a kofun burial mound located in the city of Gyōda, Saitama Prefecture, in the Kantō region of Japan. The tumulus was designated a National Historic Site in 1938 and re-designated as a Special National Historic Site of Japan in 2020 as part of the Sakitama Kofun Cluster.

Overview
The Gyōda Futagoyama Kofun has a total length (including moat) of 132.2 meters, and is thus the largest tumulus in the Saitama Kofun Cluster (and in Musashi Province). As with most other tumuli at this site, it has a double rectangular moat. The current inner moat is filled with water, but it was originally a dry moat. Another unusual feature is a protrusion extending from the western side of the tumulus, near the joint between the rectangular and circular portions. Called a "Tsukuridashi", this is a feature which also appears in the Inariyama Kofun, Teppōyama Kofun and Shōgunyama Kofun in the Sakitama Kofun Group, but is rarely found in other locations.

The internal structure of the tumulus and its burial chamber are unknown, as it has not been excavateds; however, from a ground penetrating radar curved in 2017, it appears that there is a horizontal-type stone chamber in the east side of the posterior circular portion. Portions of the tumulus were endanger of collapse due to erosion from water in the inner moat, and repair work was conducted from 2013 to 2018. Many cylindrical haniwa over one meter in size have been excavated from the moat, along with some Sue ware and Haji ware pottery, from which the tumulus is estimated to have been built in the first half of the 6th century AD.

Overall length 132.2 meters
Posterior circular portion 67.0 meter diameter x 11.7 meter high
Anterior rectangular portion 83.2 meters wide x 13.7 meters high

See also
List of Historic Sites of Japan (Saitama)

References

External links

Gyoda city home page  
Museum of the Sakitama Ancient Burial Mounds 

Kofun
Archaeological sites in Japan
History of Saitama Prefecture
Gyōda
Historic Sites of Japan